Varan Bhai Gurdas (Gurmukhi: ਵਾਰਾਂ ਭਾਈ ਗੁਰਦਾਸ vārāṁ bhā'ī guradāsa) is the name given to the 40 vars (a form of Punjabi poetry) which is traditionally attributed to Bhai Gurdas.

Bhai Gurdas was a first cousin of Mata Bhani, mother of Guru Arjan Dev. He was the first scribe of Guru Granth Sahib and a scholar of great repute. From his work it is clear that he had mastery of various Indian languages and had studied many ancient Indian religious scriptures.

Each of the 40 chapters of "Varan Bhai Gurdas" consists of a differing number of Pauris (sections, paragraphs). The composition is a collection of detailed commentary and explanation of theology and  the ethics of Sikh beliefs as outlined by the Gurus. It explains the Sikh terms like sangat, haumai, "Gun", Gurmukh and Manmukh, Sat, Naam, etc. Many of the principles of Sikhism are explained in simple terms by Bhai Sahib and at times in many different ways.

See also
 Bhai Gurdas
 Sikh scriptures

References

External links
 searchgurbani.com
 Bhai Gurdas Varan
 sikhitothemax.com
 allaboutsikhs.com

Sikh scripture